This is a list of mobile virtual network operators (MVNOs) in the United Kingdom, which lease wireless telephone and data spectrum from the four major carriers EE, O2, Three and Vodafone for resale.

Active operators

Defunct, merged and acquired operators

See also 
Mobile virtual network operator
List of mobile network operators of Europe#United Kingdom

References

 
Mobile virtual network operators
Lists of mobile phone companies
Telecommunications lists